(1911–2013) was a stable of sumo wrestlers, part of the Nishonoseki group of stables (ichimon) named after it. It first appeared in the late eighteenth century and was re-established in 1935 by the 32nd yokozuna Tamanishiki while still active.

The former ōzeki Saganohana produced the stable's greatest wrestler, yokozuna Taihō, who won a record for the time of 32 yūshō or tournament championships between 1961 and 1971. The stable's last head coach, former sekiwake Kongō, took charge in 1976, when he was adopted by the widow of the previous head. He was also on the board of directors of the Japan Sumo Association.

The stable's fortunes declined in later years. It had no sekitori wrestlers after the retirement of Daizen in 2003 and at the end had just three active wrestlers, all in sandanme or below (and one of whom, Kasachikara, was 41 years old, and the second oldest active wrestler in sumo). The naturalisation of a Chinese born rikishi, Ryūtei, opened up another spot in the stable for a foreigner, and a Mongolian wrestler was recruited in March 2010, Kengo, but he retired in May 2011 having missed several tournaments due to suffering a traumatic brain injury.

In February 2010 general affairs manager Yoshiyuki Inoguchi, a former wrestler for the stable from 1975 to 1993 under the shikona of Nijodake, was found hanged in an apparent suicide.

The stable closed after the January 2013 tournament, due to the ill health of the stablemaster and the lack of a suitable successor to him. All three of its wrestlers retired, with the rest of the personnel (except Fujigane-oyakata) moving to Matsugane stable.

The name of the stable was written in three-storey-high characters down the front of the building. It has since been demolished to make way for apartment blocks.

Owners
1976-2013: 10th Nishonoseki (former sekiwake Kongō Masahiro)
1975-1976: 9th Nishonoseki interim
1952-1975: 8th Nishonoseki (former ōzeki Saganohana Katsumi)
1938-1952: 7th Nishonoseki (former sekiwake Tamanoumi Umekichi)
 1935-1938: 6th Nishonoseki (the 32nd yokozuna Tamanishiki San'emon)

Coaches
Kitajin (former sekiwake Kirinji)
Minatogawa (former komusubi Daitetsu)
Fujigane (former komusubi Daizen)

Notable members
Tamanishiki (the 32nd yokozuna)
Taihō (the 48th yokozuna)
Daikirin (former ōzeki)
Saganohana (former ōzeki)
Rikidōzan (former sekiwake) 
Tamanoumi (former sekiwake)
Kongō (former sekiwake)
Kamikaze (former sekiwake)

Referee
Shinnosuke Shikimori (Hiromitsu Oshida) - jūryō referee

See also 
List of sumo stables

References

External links 
Nishonoseki page at Japan Sumo Association (English) (Japanese)

Defunct sumo stables